Mishkāt al-Maṣābīḥ by Walī ad-Dīn Abū ʿAbd Allāh Muḥammad ibn ʿAbd Allāh al-Khaṭīb at-Tibrīzī (d.1248) is an expanded and revised version of  al-Baghawī's Maṣābīḥ as-Sunnah. Khaṭīb at-Tibrīzī rendered this version of the original text more accessible to those not having an advanced knowledge of the science of hadith.

Description
It contains 5945 aḥādīth divided into 29 chapters and is considered to be an important collection of aḥādīth by Sunni Islamic scholars. An example of a hadith from Mishkat al-Masabih is as follows: "He is not a perfect believer, who goes to bed full and knows that his neighbour is hungry."<ref>Mishkat Al-Masabih 2/424.</ref>

Differences from al-Baghawī's Maṣābīḥ as-Sunnah
Imām at-Tibrīzī added 1511 aḥādīth to the total of 4434 aḥādīth already in Maṣābīḥ as-Sunnah. Al-Baghawī classified many aḥādīth as authentic to which other scholars did not agree at times. At-Tibrīzī expounded on the classifications that al-Baghawī placed on the aḥādīth and re-classified many of them. He also added a third section to Masabih al-Sunnah, which was already divided in two parts by al-Baghawī. This section consisted of narrations that he felt fit into the chapter and provided further clarification. Al-Baghawī did not mention the isnad of the aḥādīth he collected whereas at-Tibrīzī mentions the source from which the aḥādīth can originally be found - making the text more reliable. 

Commentaries
Many commentaries on the book have been written and published worldwide.

 Commentary of Husayn ibn `Abd Allah ibn Muhammad al-Tibi
 Mirqat al Mafatih Sharh Mishkat al-masabih is a multi-volume work, authored by 17th century Islamic scholar Mulla Ali al-Qari
 Mirat ul Manajih Sharh Mishkat al-Masabih is an Urdu explanation authored by Mufti Ahmad Yaar Khan Naeemi
 Midrajul Fawatih Sharh Miskhat al-Masabih'' authored in Bahasa Malaysia by Maulana Hasnul Hizam Hamzah

See also
 List of Sunni books
 Kutub al-Sittah
 Sahih Muslim
 Sunan Abu Dawood
 Jami' at-Tirmidhi
 Sunan ibn Majah
 Muwatta Malik
 Riyad as-Salihin

References

External links
 Various books of explanation of Mishkat Al-Masabih are available in English, Urdu, Arabic and Bangla at Australian Islamic Library
 The Book of Hadith: Sayings of the Prophet Muhammad from the Mishkat Al Masabih

9th-century Arabic books
10th-century Arabic books
Sunni literature
Hadith
Hadith collections
Sunni hadith collections